Ivan Vyacheslavovych Zotko (born 9 July 1996) is a Ukrainian professional footballer who plays as a defender for Urartu .

Career
Born in Chudniv, Zhytomyr Oblast, Zotko is a product of the Chudniv and FC Metalist School Systems.

He made his debut for FC Metalist in the match against FC Chornomorets Odesa on 6 December 2015 in the Ukrainian Premier League.

References

External links
 
 
 

1996 births
Living people
People from Chudniv
Ukrainian footballers
Ukraine youth international footballers
Ukraine under-21 international footballers
Association football defenders
FC Metalist Kharkiv players
Valencia CF Mestalla footballers
Elche CF players
Lleida Esportiu footballers
FC Olimpik Donetsk players
FC Kryvbas Kryvyi Rih players
FC Urartu players
Ukrainian Premier League players
Ukrainian First League players
Armenian Premier League players
Segunda División B players
Ukrainian expatriate footballers
Expatriate footballers in Spain
Ukrainian expatriate sportspeople in Spain
Expatriate footballers in Armenia
Ukrainian expatriate sportspeople in Armenia
Sportspeople from Zhytomyr Oblast